Iván Navarro may refer to:

 Iván Navarro (tennis) (born 1981), Spanish tennis player
 Iván Navarro (artist) (born 1972), Chilean artist